Michal Habai (born 30 July 1985) is a Slovak professional footballer who plays as a defender (or defensive midfielder). He is currently playing in Austria with SV Petzenkirchen.

Club career
Habai came to Scotland at the age of 27, having spent his career playing in his homeland of Slovakia, with a spell in the Czech Republic with Druhá liga side Baník Sokolov.

He signed for Greenock Morton in July 2013, and made his first competitive debut for Morton in a 1–0 defeat in the Scottish Challenge Cup to Annan Athletic. He scored his first goal for Morton in a 6-2 Scottish League Cup win over East Fife.

Habai turned down an offer of a trial from League One side Rangers after catching their eye playing as a trialist in Morton's pre-season friendly with Sheffield United.

Morton released Habai in January 2014, he signed for Livingston the same day. He was released by Livingston in May 2014. At the start of the 2015–16 season, Habai joined FK Rača in the Slovak third tier.

Habai moved to Austrian lower-league side SV Petzenkirchen in the summer of 2018.

Personal life
Although Habai played for Slovan Bratislava, he was a childhood fan of city rivals Artmedia Bratislava (who famously defeated Celtic in the UEFA Champions League qualifiers in 2005).

See also
Greenock Morton F.C. season 2013-14

References

External links

Living people
Slovak footballers
Greenock Morton F.C. players
1985 births
Association football defenders
Footballers from Bratislava
ŠK Slovan Bratislava players
FK Baník Sokolov players
ŠK Senec players
FC Petržalka players
Expatriate footballers in Scotland
Expatriate footballers in the Czech Republic
Slovak expatriate sportspeople in Scotland
Scottish Professional Football League players
Association football midfielders
Association football forwards
Livingston F.C. players
Expatriate footballers in Austria
Slovak expatriate sportspeople in Austria
Slovak expatriate sportspeople in the Czech Republic